Angus Fraser (born 9 December 1999 in Dundee, Scotland) is a Scottish rugby union player. He plays as a Hooker for Glasgow Warriors.

Rugby Union career

Amateur career

He played for Dundee HSFP, before the club merged with Morgan Academy RFC in 2021.

He was a recipient of the MacPhail Scholarship for the 2017-18 season, and as result had 5 months in South Africa at Stellenbosch University to aid his rugby development.

Professional career

He was given a place in the Scottish Rugby Academy for the 2020-21 season and assigned to Glasgow Warriors.

There was no Super 6 tournament that season, due to the Coronavirus pandemic. However the following season he remained in the academy assigned to Glasgow Warriors, but he was also assigned to Stirling Wolves.

He was graduated out of the academy and was given a professional contract by the Warriors in May 2021.

He made his competitive debut for the Glasgow side in the European Challenge Cup against Bath Rugby on 10 December 2022. He became Glasgow Warrior No. 350.

International career

He has played for Scotland U18 and Scotland U20.

References

1999 births
Living people
Rugby union hookers
Rugby union number eights
Glasgow Warriors players
Dundee HSFP players
Stirling County RFC players
Rugby union players from Dundee